Life is Sweet! Nice to Meet You is the second album by British artist Lightspeed Champion, released on 15 February 2010 in the UK, and 16 February 2010 in the US, although it was originally to be released on 1 February 2010, before being pushed back.

Recording 
The album began recording in late 2008 in Brooklyn with main Lightspeed Champion musician Dev Hynes and producer Ben Allen (known for his recent work with Gnarls Barkley, Animal Collective, and The Constellations), though it soon had to take a hiatus due a throat surgery Dev was required to undertake. It was then tracked within nine days at the beginning of March. Dev periodically posted five "studio reports" on his YouTube channel between 25 December 2008 and 18 March 2009.

"Smooth Day (at the Library)" originally appeared as a track on his EP, Album In A Day 2, then called simply "smooth day".

Track listing

Release history

Personnel 
 Devonté Hynes – vocals, main instrumentation, composition, arrangement
 Spacecamp (Jon Wiley, Steven Mertens, Chris Egan, Omar Shamesh) – additional instrumentation, group male vocals
 Michael Siddel – violin, additional strings
 Jon Webber – violin
 Jesse Reagen – cello
 Sally Wall – oboe
 Ben Allen – production, recording, mixing

References

External links 
Official website

2010 albums
Dev Hynes albums
Domino Recording Company albums